The 32 West Bridge Street is a historic commercial building located in Catskill, New York, United States. It was completed in 1890, and is significant as a largely intact example of the Italianate architecture of that period. It was added to the National Register of Historic Places on August 10, 1995.

References

Commercial buildings on the National Register of Historic Places in New York (state)
Commercial buildings completed in 1890
Buildings and structures in Greene County, New York
National Register of Historic Places in Greene County, New York
Italianate architecture in New York (state)
Catskill, New York